The 2010 Portuguese Social Democratic Party leadership election was held on 26 March 2010. The leadership election was held after the defeat of the PSD in the 2009 general elections. The then PSD leader, Manuela Ferreira Leite, decided to not contest this leadership election and four candidates entered in the race: Pedro Passos Coelho, candidate also in 2008; Paulo Rangel; José Pedro Aguiar-Branco and Castanheira Barros. On election day, Passos Coelho won the leadership by a landslide, capturing more than 61% of the votes, while Rangel only polled 34%. The other two candidates had results below 4%. 

Pedro Passos Coelho would lead the PSD to victory in the 2011 snap general elections and become Prime Minister.

Candidates

Opinion polls

All voters

PSD voters/PSD members

Results

See also
 Social Democratic Party (Portugal)
 List of political parties in Portugal
 Elections in Portugal

References

External links
PSD Official Website

2010 in Portugal
Political party leadership elections in Portugal
2010 elections in Portugal
Portuguese Social Democratic Party leadership election